Mary Grigoriadis (born 1942) is an American artist known for her paintings in the pattern and decoration movement.

Biography
Gigoriadis earned a bachelor's degree from Barnard College in 1963. In 1965 she received a Master of Fine Art degree from Columbia College, New York. She was a member of the Pattern and Decoration art movement and one of the four original founders of the first women's cooperative gallery in America, A.I.R (Artists In Residence) in 1972.

Her work is included in the collections of the Whitney Museum of American Art, the Smithsonian American Art Museum, and the National Museum of Women in the Arts.

References

External links
YouTube video (14 minutes) of 2013 solo exhibition at Accola Griefen Gallery narrated by James Kalm/Loren Munk

1942 births
20th-century American women artists
20th-century American painters
American women painters
Living people
Columbia College (New York) alumni
Barnard College alumni